Sherif Sabry (born 29 August 1986) is an Egyptian tennis player. Sabry has been a regular player on the Egypt Davis Cup team since 2006, he has an overall record of 27–23.

Sabry has a career high ATP singles ranking of 351 achieved on 29 September 2014. He also has a career high ATP doubles ranking of 410, achieved on 17 May 2010.

Future and Challenger finals

Singles: 19 (6–13)

External links 
 
 
 

1986 births
Egyptian male tennis players
Living people
African Games gold medalists for Egypt
African Games medalists in tennis
African Games silver medalists for Egypt
African Games bronze medalists for Egypt
Competitors at the 2011 All-Africa Games
Competitors at the 2019 African Games
21st-century Egyptian people